Christian Martin may refer to:

Christian Martin (television executive) (born 1967)
Christian Frederick Martin (1796–1873), luthier

See also
Chris Martin (disambiguation)
Christian Martínez (disambiguation)
Christopher Martin (disambiguation)